Dr. Krithi Karanth is Chief Conservation Scientist and Director at the Centre for Wildlife Studies, Bangalore, Adjunct Faculty at Duke University and National Centre for Biological Sciences.

Dr. Krithi K Karanth, Chief Conservation Scientist at Bengaluru-based Centre for Wildlife Studies (CWS), has been chosen as the first Indian and Asian woman for the 2021 ‘WILD Innovator Award’. This award given by the ‘‘WILD ELEMENTS Foundation” brings together a coalition of innovators, advocates and partners to “disrupt the status quo and identify solutions to global sustainability and conservation,”.

Work
Krithi Karanth has a Ph.D from Duke (2008), a M.E.Sc from Yale (2003), and, B.S and B.A degrees from the University of Florida (2001). Her research in India and Asia spans 22 years encompasses many issues in human dimensions of wildlife conservation. She has conducted macro-level studies assessing patterns of species distributions and extinctions, impacts of wildlife tourism, consequences of voluntary resettlement, land use change and understanding human-wildlife interactions. She has published 100+ scientific and popular articles. Krithi served on the editorial boards of journals Conservation Biology, Conservation Letters and Frontiers in Ecology and Environment. Krithi has mentored over 150 young scientists and engaged 700 citizen science volunteers in her research and conservation projects. Her work has been covered by >150 international media such as Al Jazeera Television, BBC, Christian Science Monitor, GQ India, Harper's Bazaar, Mongabay, Monocle, National Geographic, NPR, New York Times, Scientific America, Time Magazine and Indian outlets such as All India Radio, Deccan Chronicle, Deccan Herald, Down to Earth, Kannada Prabha, LiveMint, New Indian Express, Prajavani, The Hindu, and Times of India. Krithi’s conservation and research work has been featured in 3 award-winning BBC Series - The Hunt, Big Cats and Dynasties, and documentaries by CBC and PBS. She has co-produced 3 documentaries Wild Seve, Humane Highways and Wild Shaale.

In popular culture
Krithi is National Geographic Society’s 10,000th grantee and 2012 Emerging Explorer. Her more than 40 awards and recognitions include World Economic Forum Young Global Leader, University of Florida’s Outstanding Young Alumnus, INK Fellow, India's Power Women by Femina, Women of the Year by Elle India, Vogue Women of the Year and Seattle Zoo’s Thrive Conservation Leadership Award. In 2019, she received the WINGS Women of Discovery Award for Conservation, GQ Man of the Year- Environmental Hero and was awarded the Rolex Award for Enterprise.

Honours and awards
 In 2011 she was honoured as National Geographic Society's 10,000th grantee.
 She was selected as National Geographic Emerging Explorer in 2012.
 She was selected as one of India's Power Women by Femina in 2012. 
 Women of the Year by Elle India 2013.
 2019 Women Of Discovery Award
 Wild life innovator award 2021

In 2021
Dr. Krithi K Karanth, Chief Conservation Scientist at Bengaluru-based Centre for Wildlife Studies (CWS), has been chosen as the first Indian and Asian woman for the 2021 ‘WILD Innovator Award’. This award given by the ‘‘WILD ELEMENTS Foundation” brings together a coalition of innovators, advocates and partners to “disrupt the status quo and identify solutions to global sustainability and conservation,”.

References

Living people
Scientists from Mangalore
Indian conservationists
Articles created or expanded during Women's History Month (India) - 2015
Year of birth missing (living people)
University of Florida alumni
Yale University alumni
Indian women biologists
20th-century Indian biologists
Indian women environmentalists
20th-century Indian women scientists
Activists from Karnataka